The Commissioned Reunion Live is an album by the American contemporary gospel music group Commissioned, released on April 23, 2002 via Verity Records.

Domestically, the album peaked at number 3 on the US Billboard Top Gospel albums chart and number 8 on the Billboard Top Contemporary Christian chart.

Track listing
Disc 1 and 2
 "Hype (Strange Land) [Live]" (1:06)
 "Triumphant Entry [Live]" (2:59)
 "You've Got A Friend [Live]" (2:32)
 "I'm Going On [Live]" (4:16)
 "You Keep on Blessing Me [Live]" (3:00)
 "Back in the Saddle [Live]" (4:43) 
 "Go Tell Somebody [Live]" (4:29)
 "Lord Jesus Help Me (Help Somebody Else) [Live]" (6:13)
 "Everlasting Love [Live]" (3:53) 
 "Hold Me (Leaning) [Live]" (4:24)
 "I Am Here [Live]" (4:05)
 "King of Glory [Live]" (5:36)
 "Let Me Tell It [Live]" (4:26)
"Lay Your Troubles Down [Live]" (3:57)
"Giving My Problems to You [Live]" (5:13)
 "The City [Live]" (2:26)
 "Cry On [Live]" (1:27) 
 "Love Isn't Love [Live]" (2:12)
 "Ordinary Just Won't Do [Live]" (8:44)
 "When Love Calls You Home [Live]" (3:15)
 "Please You More [Live]" (2:37)
 "Secret Place [Live]" (4:43)
 "Find Myself in You [Live]" (2:11)
 "Will You Be Ready? [Live]" (3:41)
 "'Tis So Sweet [Live]" (3:47)
 "Running Back to You [Live]" (7:15)
 "So Good to Know (The Savior) [Live]" (6:08)
 "Victory [Live]" (4:25)
 "I Can't Live Without U [Live]" (6:07)

There are two prologues in the beginning where they are freestyling, known as "Hype (Strange Land)" and "Triumphant Entry".

Credits
Recorded live October 26, 2001 at Straight Gate International Church in Detroit, Michigan.

Producer:
 Fred Hammond
 Noel Hall
 Tommie Walker
 Marcus Cole

Executive producer:
 Fred Hammond

Arrangers:
 Noel Hall - arranger, horn arrangements
 Marvin Thompson - horn arrangements
 Tommie Walker - arranger
 Fred Hammond - arranger, horn arrangements, vocal arrangements
 Luther Hanes - arranger

Worship leaders:
Commissioned
 Fred Hammond
 Mitchell Jones
 Karl Reid
 Marcus Cole
 Marvin Sapp
 Keith Staten

Musicians:
 Noel Hall - keyboard, organ, piano, (MD)
 Marvin McQuitty – drums
 Michael Williams – drums
 Darius Fentress - percussion
 Darryl Dixon - electric guitar
 Fred Hammond – bass guitar
 Joey Woolfalk – acoustic guitar
 Earl Wright – keyboard
 Tommie Walker - drum programming, keyboard programming
 Luther Hanes - synthesizer bass
 Mo' Horns includes:
 Randolph Ellis – saxophone
 Marvin Thompson – trombone
 Clifton Brockington – trumpet

Radical For Christ (additional vocals):
 Pamkenyon Donald
 Davey Hammond
 Marsha D. Johns
 Bryan Pratt
 Frederick Purifoy II
 JoAnn Rosario
 Danielle Stephens

Engineers
 Chris Athens - mastering
 Darius Fentress - assistant engineer
 Dan Glomski - assistant remote engineer
 Fred Hammond - engineer, mixing,
 Ray Hammond - engineer, mixing, mixing engineer, sound reinforcement, sound technician
 John Jaszcz - engineer
 Timothy Powell - engineer
 Greg Snyder - sound reinforcement
 Kevin Wilson - engineer, mixing engineer

Production coordinators:
 PamKenyon Donald - production coordination
 Marsha D. Johns - production administrator
 Bryan Pratt - production administrator

References

Commissioned (gospel group) albums
2002 live albums